Eufaula National Wildlife Refuge is an 11,184 acre (45.26 km2) National Wildlife Refuge located in Barbour and Russell counties in Alabama and Stewart and Quitman counties in Georgia. Eufaula NWR is located on the Walter F. George Lake (also known as Lake Eufaula) along the Chattahoochee River between Alabama and Georgia. Of the 11,184 acres (45.26 km2) of managed property, 7,953 acres (32.18 km2) are in Alabama and 3,231 acres (13.08 km2) are in Georgia.

Eufaula NWR was established in 1964 in cooperation with the United States Army Corps of Engineers which manages the Walter F. George Lock and Dam and the majority of Walter F. George Lake. More than 325,000 visitors per year visit the refuge. The fiscal year 2005 budget was $718,000.

Wildlife
The Eufaula NWR protects endangered and threatened species such as the wood stork.

There is a variety of wildlife habitats in the Eufaula NWR including approximately 4000 acres (16 km2) of open water, 3000 acres (12 km2) of wetlands, 2000 acres (8 km2) of woodlands, 1000 acres (4 km2) of croplands and 1000 acres (4 km2) of grasslands. This diverse area provides shelter for migratory waterfowl and other birds. Other wildlife species include raccoon, white-tailed deer, quail, beaver, red and gray fox species, dove, bobcat, hawk, armadillo, owl, rabbit, squirrel, river otter, turkey, and coyote, not to mention other reptiles (alligators and copperheads), amphibians, insects and various fishes.

Facilities

Lake Eufaula offers several activities including boating and fishing. Additionally, there is a seven-mile (11 km) auto-tour trail, two observation towers, and a walking trail. Lakepoint State Park borders the Eufaula NWR on the Alabama side of the river, near the city of Eufaula.

See also
 List of National Wildlife Refuges

External links
 Eufaula National Wildlife Refuge homepage
 Recreation.gov overview
 

Protected areas of Barbour County, Alabama
Chattahoochee River
National Wildlife Refuges in Alabama
National Wildlife Refuges in Georgia (U.S. state)
Protected areas of Quitman County, Georgia
Protected areas of Russell County, Alabama
Protected areas of Stewart County, Georgia
Protected areas established in 1964
Wetlands of Alabama
Landforms of Barbour County, Alabama
Landforms of Quitman County, Georgia
Landforms of Russell County, Alabama
Landforms of Stewart County, Georgia
Wetlands of Georgia (U.S. state)
Alabama placenames of Native American origin
Georgia placenames of Native American origin